The Corporation of the Town of Walkerville (or Town of Walkerville) is a small local government area in the central suburbs of Adelaide, South Australia.

The residents of the Town of Walkerville are represented by a mayor and eight councillors. The area is home to the highest concentration of top earners in South Australia, and was named "South Australia's richest postcode" in 2016.

History
The District Council of Walkerville was first proclaimed on 5 July 1855, severing the area from the District Council of Yatala after a petition by local residents proclaimed a desire to break away from the larger District Council of Yatala (proclaimed in 1853). Initially, only the suburbs of Walkerville and Gilberton seceded from Yatala but within a few months, Medindie and North Walkerville (now part of Walkerville proper, east of Fuller Street) were annexed by Walkerville. The district boundaries remained unchanged until 1970 when Vale Park was annexed from the City of Enfield.

Early council meetings were held in a room at the local pub, the Sussex Arms. In 1893 the council seat moved across Stephen Terrace to the present location by the Walkerville Town Hall on Walkerville Terrace, Gilberton.

It was granted corporate town status on 1 October 1944, becoming the Town of Walkerville.

Suburbs
 Gilberton (5081)
 Medindie (5081)
 Vale Park (5081)
 Walkerville (5081)

Mayors (formerly Chairmen) of Walkerville

 JT Mellor (1906), appointed to the Municipal Tramways Trust
 Alfred Thiele (1935-1937) 
 Louis David Waterhouse (1937-1938) 
 John Creswell (1939-1944) 
 Frank Davies Wilson (1944-1946) 
 George Dorricutt Shaw (1946-1947) 
 Frederick Louis Rungie (1948-1951) 
 Howard Herbert Dayman (1951-1955) 
 Frank Davies Wilson (1955-1956) 
 Cecil Ernest Searle (1956-1961) 
 Lance Milne (1961-1964) 
 Ernest Phillipson (1964-1965) 
 Leonard Ewens (1966-1969) 
 Edwin Scales (1969-1977) 
 Kenneth Price (1977-1982) 
 George Sparnon (1982-1987) 
 Margot Vowles (1987-1991) 
 Ian McBryde (1991-1995)
 Rosemary Craddock (1995-2000) 
 John Rich (2000-2006) 
 David Whiting (2006-2010) 
 Heather Wright (2010-2014) 
 Ray Grigg (2014–2018) 
Elizabeth Fricker (2018–2022) 
Melissa Jones (2022-) 

List of Mayors of Walkerville (since 1939)
Lists the Ward that the Mayor served before and after their tenure and all elections they contested. Data taken from South Australian Government Gazettes, LGA reports and Mayoral biographical articles.

See also
 List of Adelaide parks and gardens

References

External links
Town of Walkerville website
Town of Walkerville community profile

Walkerville
Walkerville